Florian Cazenave (born 30 December 1989 in Tarbes) is a French rugby union player. His position is Scrum-half and he currently plays for Vannes in the Pro D2.

Honours
Top 14 Champion – 2008–09

External links

References

1989 births
Living people
French rugby union players
Sportspeople from Tarbes
USA Perpignan players
Rugby union scrum-halves